Koryak may refer to:
Koryaks, a people of northeastern Siberia
Koryak language, language of the Koryaks
Koryak Okrug, an administrative division of Kamchatka Krai, Russia
Koryak, the son of Aquaman, a fictional character in DC Comics

See also